Khorol may refer to:
Khorol, Ukraine, a town in Poltava Oblast, Ukraine
Khorol (river), a river in Ukraine
, a village in Sumy Oblast, Ukraine
Khorol, Russia, a rural locality (a selo) in Primorsky Krai, Russia
Khorol Airfield, a large military base east of Khorol, Primorsky Krai
David Khorol, Jewish Soviet mathematician, aviation and rocket designer
Khorol (game), a tile-based game played in Mongolia, Inner Mongolia, and Tuva

See also
Khorolsky (disambiguation)